Cryptandra exilis, commonly known as slender pearlflower, is a species of flowering plant in the family Rhamnaceae and is endemic to Tasmania. It is a small, straggly, low-growing shrub with linear leaves and tube-shaped white or cream-coloured flowers arranged in small groups on the ends of branches.

Description
The flowers are usually arranged in groups of 2 to 6 on the ends of the main branches with dark brown bracts at the base, half as long as the sepal tube.

Taxonomy
Cryptandra exilis was first formally described in 1991 by Dennis Ivor Morris in Aspects of Tasmanian Botany - a tribute to Winifred Curtis from specimens collected by Tony Moscal in 1980. The specific epithet (exilis) means "small" or "weak".

Distribution and habitat 
Slender pearlflower grows in heathy or shrubby forest from Cape Barren Island to the Tasman Peninsula on the east coast of Tasmania.

References

exilis
Rosales of Australia
Flora of Tasmania
Plants described in 1991